The Light + Time Tower is a sculpture located in the city of Raleigh, North Carolina designed to diffract the morning and afternoon sunlight into vibrant colors visible to the commuters who pass by it. It is located in the median of Capital Boulevard just northeast of the Fairview Road overpass.

The Light + Time Tower consists of a  tower supporting 20 panels of clear glass. It was created by internationally known sculptor Dale Eldred and was commissioned by the Raleigh Arts Commission in 1995. Its $51,100 cost was criticized by then-mayoral candidate Tom Fetzer in that year's mayoral race.

The tower was defaced with trucker mudflap girls soon after installation, which were affixed in the middle of each panel, but were soon removed.

See also 
Community arts
Public art

External links 
City of Raleigh: Time + Light Tower
Raleigh News and Observer: Avant-Garde strikes out again
Raleigh Arts Commission
Raleigh's Controversial Light + Time Tower: A Tragic Love Story

Buildings and structures in Raleigh, North Carolina
Towers in North Carolina
Outdoor sculptures in North Carolina
Glass works of art
1995 sculptures
Buildings and structures completed in 1995